Seeley Lake Provincial Park is a provincial park in British Columbia, Canada, located within the asserted traditional territory of the Gitxsan First Nation, south of the confluence of the Skeena and Bulkley Rivers.

The park offers compelling views of the Hazelton Mountains, and contains wetlands harboring a variety of nesting birds, mammals and reptiles.

References

Skeena Country
Provincial parks of British Columbia
Protected areas established in 1956
1956 establishments in British Columbia